Garrett Reese Fortune (October 11, 1894 – September 23, 1955) was a pitcher in Major League Baseball who played between  and  for the Philadelphia Phillies (1916, 1918) and Boston Red Sox (1920). He was born in High Point, North Carolina.

In a three-season career, Fortune posted a 0–5 record with 23 strikeouts and a 6.61 ERA in 20 appearances, including six starts, two complete games, 11 games finished, 46 walks, and 77.2 innings of work. 
 
Fortune died in Washington, D.C., in 1955, at age 60.

Sources

Retrosheet

Boston Red Sox players
Philadelphia Phillies players
Major League Baseball pitchers
Baseball players from North Carolina
1894 births
1955 deaths
Asheville Mountaineers players
Asheville Tourists players
New London Planters players
Pittsfield Hillies players
Springfield Hampdens players
Toronto Maple Leafs (International League) players
Springfield Ponies players
Hartford Senators players
New Haven Profs players